The women's 4 x 100 metres relay at the 2015 IAAF World Relays was held at the Thomas Robinson Stadium on 2 May.

Records
Prior to the competition, the records were as follows:

Schedule

Results

Heats
Qualification: First 2 of each heat (Q) plus the 2 fastest times (q) advanced to the final.

Final B
The final B was started at 21:47.

Final
The final was started at 21:57.

References

4 x 100 metres relay
4 × 100 metres relay
2015 in women's athletics